Lenawee Mountain is a mountain east of Dillon in Summit County, Colorado. Porcupine Peak lies west of Lenawee Mountain and Grizzly Peak is located northeast. The Arapahoe Basin ski area is located on a portion of the mountain.

References

Mountains of Colorado
Mountains of Summit County, Colorado
North American 4000 m summits